Science fiction and fantasy in Poland dates to the late 18th century. During the latter years of the People's Republic of Poland, a very popular genre of science fiction was social science fiction. Later, many other genres gained prominence.

Poland has many science-fiction writers. Internationally, the best known Polish science-fiction writer is the late Stanisław Lem. As elsewhere, Polish science fiction is closely related to the genres of fantasy, horror and others.

While many English-language writers have been translated into Polish, relatively little Polish-language science fiction (or fantasy) has been translated into English.

History 

Science fiction in Poland started in the late 18th century during the Polish Enlightenment, when Michał Dymitr Krajewski wrote a novel about the adventures of a Pole on the Moon. In the mid-19th century, during the age of romanticism in Poland, Adam Mickiewicz, reckoned by many to be Poland's top poet, also worked on a Verne-like science fiction novel A History of the Future, but never published it (only a few fragments remain). Later in the same century, the period of positivism in Poland saw several writers explore themes similar to Verne and H.G. Wells, among them Władysław Umiński, Włodzimierz Zagórski and Sygurd Wiśniowski. However, perhaps the most famous Polish writer of the time, Bolesław Prus, used science fiction elements in his mainstream fiction. For example, his novel Lalka includes a "mad scientist" as well as a "lighter-than-air" metal. Similar themes are seen in the works of Prus's colleague, Stefan Żeromski, with his 'houses of glass' in Przedwiośnie, and his death rays in Róża.

In the early 20th century Jerzy Żuławski was probably the most popular Polish science fiction author, with his Lunar Trilogy (Trylogia księżycowa), a masterpiece for its time and place of composition. Similar works were created by Tadeusz Konczyński, Wacław Gąsiorowski and Maria Julia Zaleska. In the reborn Second Polish Republic other writers followed in this genre. Finally, Antoni Słonimski's Dwa końce świata (Two Ends of the World) is perhaps the best known dystopian work of the time.

After World War II, in the first decade of the People's Republic of Poland, science fiction was used as a propaganda tool by the communist regime, with its main purpose being to show the "bright future" of communism. Only after Joseph Stalin's death were Polish writers to gain more leeway and start questioning the reality around them, albeit always struggling against censorship. At that time the undisputed leader of Polish science fiction was Stanisław Lem, who first questioned the regime's actions in his Memoirs Found in a Bathtub. He was followed by Janusz A. Zajdel, Konrad Fiałkowski and Czesław Chruszczewski, and from the mid-70s for a short period by the acclaimed writings of Adam Wiśniewski-Snerg.

In the late 1970s the genre social science fiction (Polish: fantastyka socjologiczna) arose in the People's Republic of Poland. At these times it focused on the development of societies dominated by totalitarian governments. The genre is dominated by Janusz A. Zajdel (Limes Inferior, Paradyzja), Edmund Wnuk-Lipiński (Apostezjon trilogy), Adam Wiśniewski-Snerg and Marek Oramus. Some works by Stanisław Lem can also be classified within this genre. The fantastical settings of books of this genre were usually only a pretext for analysing the structure of Polish society, and were always full of allusions to reality.

The 1980s were marked by the creation of the first Polish literary magazine dedicated to science fiction and fantasy, Fantastyka, later renamed to Nowa Fantastyka. Established by the writer and journalist Adam Hollanek, it gained a cult following and became a training ground for some of the most prominent fantasy and sci-fi writers in Poland, including Andrzej Sapkowski (The Witcher series).

The 1980s were also the time Polish comics dealing with fantasy and science fiction were released, such as The Witcher comic book, and the science fiction comic series Funky Koval.

After the revolutions of 1989, when the use of real-world examples in fiction became safe in former Eastern Bloc countries, the genre largely transformed itself into political fiction, represented by writers such as Rafał A. Ziemkiewicz, although an echo is visible in the 1990s dystopia/hard sf duology by Tomasz Kołodziejczak.

In the 1990s there was an explosion of translations, primarily from the Western (English language) literature. The major Polish publishing house specializing in Polish science fiction and fantasy literature was SuperNOWA. The scene was transformed around and after 2002, with SuperNOWA losing its dominant position, and many new Polish writers, the "2002 generation", appearing. An increasing number of translations from non-English speaking countries (Russian, Ukrainian, Czech) has been noticeable as well.

Currently, much of Polish science fiction and fantasy resembles that familiar to English-language writers. There are many science fiction writers as well as fantasy writers in Poland, and their works vary from alternate histories to hard science fiction. The best internationally known Polish science fiction writer is undoubtedly Stanisław Lem, although many others can be considered world-class, with their books being translated into many (mostly European) languages. Relatively little Polish language science fiction and fantasy has been translated into English, even though countless English language writers have been translated into Polish.

Modern writers 

Modern Polish science fiction and fantasy writers include:

 Ewa Białołęcka
 Anna Brzezińska: one of the youngest Polish writers, known for her ongoing fantasy saga, the first book of which (Zbójecki Gościniec) was released in 1999. 
 Eugeniusz Dębski: a writer of fantasy and science fiction, best known for two series—the science fiction detective stories of Owen Yeates and the humorous adventures of a 'chameleon knight', Hondelyk. 
 Jacek Dukaj: one of the most acclaimed writers of the 1990s and 2000s, and winner of many awards. He is known for the complexity of his books, and it is often said that a single short story by Dukaj contains more ideas than many other writers put into their books in their lifetime. His books are generally hard sf; popular themes include the technological singularity, nanotechnology and virtual reality. Among his favourite writers is Australian Greg Egan, and Dukaj's books bear some resemblance to Egan's.
 Jarosław Grzędowicz: author of fantasy stories, winner of Zajdel award for book and short story in 2005.
Adam Hollanek: writer and journalist, the founder of Fantastyka
 Anna Kańtoch
 Tomasz Kołodziejczak: science fiction and fantasy writer, screenwriter, publisher and editor of books, comics and role-playing games.
 Marek Huberath: author of many short stories, he focuses on the humanistic aspects (psychology, feelings, motivations, etc.) of his characters.
 Maja Lidia Kossakowska: a fantasy writer, her trademark is the frequent appearance of angels. 
 Feliks W. Kres: best known for his two fantasy cycles: Księga całości (The Book of Entirety), set on a world called Szerer, where cats and vultures as well as humans are intelligent, and Piekło i szpada (Hell and spade), a dark fantasy set in an alternate 17th century, where demons and beings older than Satan openly interact with humanity
 Jacek Komuda: known for his fantasy stories set in the Polish–Lithuanian Commonwealth; his writing often closely resembles a historical novel, though he doesn't shy from supernatural elements such as witches and devils. He is also one of the authors of the Dzikie Pola role-playing game set in that period.
 Stanisław Lem. Lem was Poland's most acclaimed and famous science fiction writer (although he has mostly stopped writing in the science fiction genre before the 1990s), and the only one who had had most of his works translated into English. He often veered into philosophical speculation on technology, the nature of intelligence, the impossibility of mutual communication and understanding, and humankind's place in the universe. His works are sometimes presented as fiction, to avoid the trappings of academic life and the limitations of readership and scientific style, while others take the form of essays and philosophical books. 
 Konrad T. Lewandowski
 Łukasz Orbitowski
 
 Jacek Piekara
 Andrzej Pilipiuk is best known for his humorous series about Jakub Wędrowycz, an alcoholic exorcist and unwilling superhero. Recently he started another popular series, featuring the adventures of three women: an over-1000-year-old vampire, a 300-year-old alchemist-szlachcianka, and her relative, a former Polish secret agent from the CBŚ (Central Bureau of Investigation). A recurring character in the series is the alchemist Michał Sędziwój, and the universe is the same as the one of Wędrowycz (who makes appearances from time to time).
 Andrzej Sapkowski. Sapkowski is one of the bestselling Polish authors, translated into many languages (recently into English), he is best known for his The Witcher fantasy series. The main character of the series is Geralt, a mutant assassin trained from childhood to hunt down and destroy monsters and other unnatural creatures. Geralt moves in an ambiguous moral universe, yet manages to maintain his own coherent code of ethics. At once cynical and noble, Geralt has been compared to Raymond Chandler's signature character Philip Marlowe. The world in which these adventures take place owes much to J.R.R. Tolkien, while also heavily influenced by Polish history and Slavic mythology.
 
 Wit Szostak
 Janusz Zajdel. He became the second most popular Polish science fiction writer (after Stanisław Lem) until his sudden death in 1985. Zajdel's novels created the core of Polish social fiction and dystopian fiction. In his works, he envisions totalitarian states and collapsed societies.  His heroes are desperately trying to find sense in world around them; sometimes, as in Cylinder van Troffa, they are outsiders from a different time or place, trying to adapt to a new environment.  The main recurring theme in his works is a comparison of the readers' gloomy, hopeless situations to what may happen in a space environment if we carry totalitarian ideas and habits into space worlds: Red Space Republics or Space Labour Camps, or both. The Janusz A. Zajdel Award of Polish fandom is named after him.
 Rafał A. Ziemkiewicz. In the 1990s he was one of the most popular Polish science fiction authors. For his novels Pieprzony los kataryniarza (1995) and Walc stulecia (1998), as well as his short story Śpiąca królewna (1996) he was awarded the prestigious Zajdel Award. A popular theme in his works is the fate of Poland and more broadly, Europe, in the near future (from several to several dozen years). His books often paint the future in dark colours, showing the Commonwealth of Independent States disintegrate into a civil war, European Union becoming powerless in the face of Islamic terrorism, and predatory capitalism and political correctness taken ad absurdum leading to the erosion of morality and ethics. Thus his books are often classified as political fiction and social science fiction, although they stop short of being seen as dystopian fiction.
 Andrzej Zimniak
 Andrzej Ziemiański. Ziemiański writes both science fiction—with themes like post-apocalyptic Autobahn nach Poznan and alternative history Bomba Heisenberga, and fantasy, like his most recent Achaja series.

Publishers 
There are two major Polish science fiction and fantasy monthly magazines. The oldest one is Nowa Fantastyka  (published  in 1982-1990 as Fantastyka). Another one, founded in 2001, is Science Fiction, which publishes mainly new Polish works and much fewer translations than Nowa Fantastyka. As of 2006, both had a circulation of about 8,000–15,000. Discontinued magazines  include Fenix (1990–2001), SFinks (1994–2002) and Magia i Miecz (1993–2002). Several are published online in ezine form, including Fahrenheit and Esensja.

There are two major Polish publishing houses specializing in Polish science fiction and fantasy, Fabryka Słów and Runa. SuperNOWA, once a dominant publishing house on that field, has now lost much of its position. MAG and Solaris publish mostly translations, and in what is seen as boom for the Polish science fiction and fantasy market, mainstream publishing houses are increasingly publishing such works as well. A book with a circulation of over 10,000 is considered a bestseller in Poland.

Fandom 
Polish science fiction fandom is prominent, with dozens of science fiction conventions throughout Poland. The largest of them is Polcon (first held in 1982), other prominent ones include Falkon, Imladris, Krakon and Nordcon. Science fiction conventions in Poland are de facto almost always "science fiction and fantasy conventions", and are often heavily mixed with role-playing gaming conventions. On the other hand, although Poland has also several manga and anime conventions, they are usually kept separate from the science fiction and gaming fandom conventions. The most important comic books and science-fiction conventions in Poland include the Warsaw Comic Con and the International Festival of Comics and Games in Łódź.

Literary awards

Janusz A. Zajdel Award (briefly known as "Sfinks")
Nautilus Prize
Śląkfa, the award of the oldest Polish fandom club, the Silesian Fantasy Club.
, the award of the  magazine
Jerzy Żuławski Literary Award, founded in 2008 in honour of Jerzy Żuławski

Other media 
Polish science fiction writing has not had much impact on non-print media like cinema, television and computer games, although several science fiction, fantasy and horror films and games have been made in Poland. The notable exception is Seksmisja (Sex Mission) which has become something of a cult film in Poland, and has been widely aired abroad, for example in UK. Other lesser-known examples include the films of Piotr Szulkin.

In the late 2015s, The Witcher computer game series became a best-seller worldwide.

Notes

References 
 An Overview of Polish Science Fiction & Fantasy, last accessed on 15 June 2006
  Historia polskiej literatury fantastycznej (History of Polish fantasy literature)
  —summary and review of book by Antoni Szmuszkiewicz with the same title about history of Polish science fiction literature, published in 1982

External links 
Polish Cinematic Dystopias
Polish Science Fiction
Futurological Congress - Contemporary Polish Fantasy and Sci-Fi by Marcin Zwierzchowski